Alpha 2-antiplasmin (or α2-antiplasmin or plasmin inhibitor) is a serine protease inhibitor (serpin) responsible for inactivating plasmin. Plasmin is an important enzyme that participates in fibrinolysis and degradation of various other proteins. This protein is encoded by the SERPINF2 gene.

Role in disease 

Very few cases (<20) of A2AP deficiency have been described. As plasmin degrades blood clots, impaired inhibition of plasmin leads to a bleeding tendency, which was severe in the cases reported.

In liver cirrhosis, there is decreased production of alpha 2-antiplasmin, leading to decreased inactivation of plasmin and an increase in fibrinolysis.  This is associated with an increase risk of bleeding in liver disease.

Interactions 

Alpha 2-antiplasmin has been shown to interact with:
 Neutrophil elastase and
 Plasmin.

See also 
 Serpin

References

Further reading

External links 
 The MEROPS online database for peptidases and their inhibitors: I04.023
 
 
 

Serine protease inhibitors
Fibrinolytic system